This is a list of canals in India.

 Agra canal
 Sethusamudram Shipping Canal Project
 Buckingham Canal
 Handri-Neeva
 K. C. Canal
 Conolly Canal
 Munak canal
 Western Yamuna Canal
 Eastern Yamuna Canal
 Kutte Kol
 Nallah Mar
 Tsoont Kol
 Buddha Nullah
 Indira Gandhi Canal
 Sirhind Canal
 Sutlej Yamuna link canal
 Anupgarh canal
 Ganges Canal
 Ummed Sagar Bandh
 Ainsley canal
 Kalingarayan Canal
 Kaveri–Vaigai link canal
 Lower Bhavani Project Canal
 Tamirabarani–Nambiar link canal
 Telugu Ganga project
 Kakatiya Canal
Zamania Canal
Karmanasa Canal
Deokali Canal
Durgavati Canal
 Najafgarh drain
 Narmada Canal
 Parvathi Puthannaar
 Soundane Cut
 Thiruvananthapuram–Shoranur canal
 Cumbarjua Canal, Goa

See also
 List of National Waterways in India
 List of canals
 List of rivers of India

India
Canals

Canals
Canals